Architecture and Design Scotland, styled Architecture+DesignScotland (A&DS), is an executive non-departmental public body of the Scottish Government. It was established in 2004 to provide advice to the government and bodies involved in commissioning, designing and regulating new buildings and places.

References

External links
 Official website

Architecture in Scotland
Scottish design
Executive non-departmental public bodies of the Scottish Government
Organisations based in Edinburgh
2005 establishments in Scotland
Government agencies established in 2005